Dreamlab may refer to:

 Dreamlab (album), album by the German band Mythos
 Dreamlab (production team), Australian production team consisting of Daniel James and Leah Haywood
 DreamLab, a volunteer computing mobile Android and IOS app